Dapo Sarumi is a Nigerian politician from Lagos State. He was the former minister for Information. In 1991, he contested the Social Democratic Party (Nigeria) gubernatorial primary under the People's Front faction of the SDP led by Shehu Musa Yar'adua, members of the PF included Yomi Edu, Bola Tinubu, Abdullahi Aliyu Sumaila, Abubakar Koko,  Babalola Borishade, Umaru Musa Yar'adua, Sabo Bakin Zuwo, and  Rabiu Musa Kwankwaso but he was later dis-qualified.

In late 2000, he was involved in a traffic accident and lost two of his ministerial aides."Minister Loses Aides In Road Crash," Panafrican News Agency, December 27, 2000.

References

Living people
Federal ministers of Nigeria
Social Democratic Party (Nigeria) politicians
Yoruba politicians
Lagos State politicians
20th-century births
Year of birth missing (living people)